Elçin Kaya (born 1 March 1993 in Beypazarı, Ankara) is a Turkish female track and field athlete competing in shot put and discus.

International competitions

Personal bests

Last updated 28 July 2015.

References

External links

Living people
1993 births
People from Beypazarı
Turkish female discus throwers
Turkish female shot putters
Islamic Solidarity Games competitors for Turkey